Ancylosis singhalella is a species of snout moth in the genus Ancylosis. It was described by Émile Louis Ragonot in 1889 and is known from Kandy, Sri Lanka.

References

Moths described in 1889
singhalella
Moths of Asia